Yang Wenji (born 24 September 1993) is a Chinese footballer who currently plays for Jiangxi Beidamen in the China League One.

Club career 
Yang Wenji joined the senior senior team of China League Two club Hebei Zhongji in the 2011 league campaign. He would often been used as a substitute player in the club, however he was part of the Hebei team that gained promotion to China League One at the end of the 2013 campaign. He made 13 appearances in the 2015 season as Hebei finished runners-up of the league and promotion to the Chinese Super League. 

On 11 January 2017, Yang moved to League One side Meizhou Hakka. He made his debut in a league game on 10 March 2018 against Shijiazhuang Ever Bright in a 2-1 defeat. He would then go on to be a member of the team that gained promotion to the top tier after coming second within the division at the end of the 2021 China League One campaign. On 27 April 2022, Yang would join another second tier club in Jiangxi Beidamen and would go on to make his debut in a league game on 10 June 2022 against Nanjing City in a 1-1 draw.

Career statistics 
.

References

External links
 

Living people
1993 births
Association football defenders
Chinese footballers
Footballers from Wuhan
Hebei F.C. players
Meizhou Hakka F.C. players
Chinese Super League players
China League One players
China League Two players
21st-century Chinese people